The 2016–17 Turkish Men's Volleyball League is the 47th edition of the top-flight professional men's volleyball league in Turkey.

Regular season

League table

Source: Turkish Volleyball Federation

Updated: 15 April 2016

Results

Play-Out

Playoffs

The eight teams that finished in the places 1 to 8 in the Regular season, compete in the Play-off (1-8).

Playoffs 5-8
The fourth teams loser in the Play-off (1-8).

References

External links 
Turkish Volleyball Federastion official web page

Turkish Volleyball League
Turkish Volleyball League
Men's
2016 in Turkish sport
2017 in Turkish sport
Turkey